Yatrik, a 1952 Indian film directed by Kartick Chatterjee, depicts a group of pilgrims on an arduous trek in the high Himalayas. It is the Hindi-language version of the Bengali film Mahaprasthaner Pathey, the film made from the book of the same name, written by Prabodh Kumar Sanyal. Abhi Bhattacharya plays a young brahmachari, while Arundhati Mukherjee plays Rani, a strong-willed young widow who develops a soft corner for him. The film contains many sweet and memorable songs. A part of the film was shot at the Garhwal region in the Himalayas. There are stills and videos of famous places of the Uttarakhand (then Uttar Pradesh) Himalayas like Rishikesh, Devaprayag, Kedarnath, etc.

Cast

Music
 Playback Singers were: Dhananjay Bhattacharya, Binota Chakraborty, Pankaj Mullick
 Music by Pankaj Mullick
 Lyrics by Pt. Bhushan

References

External links 
 

1952 films
1950s Hindi-language films
Indian drama films
1952 drama films
Indian black-and-white films
Films scored by Pankaj Mullick